Orange Goblin/Alabama Thunderpussy is a split EP by heavy metal bands Orange Goblin and Alabama Thunderpussy, released via Eccentric Man Records in 2000. Both bands contributed a cover version of a 1970s hard rock/proto metal band; Orange Goblin covered Leaf Hound while Alabama Thunderpussy covered Captain Beyond. The album art is an engraving of Stede Bonnet from the 1724 book A General History of the Pyrates.

Track listing

Orange Goblin 
 "Freelance Fiend" (Leaf Hound)

Alabama Thunderpussy 
 "Can't Feel Nothing" (Captain Beyond)

Personnel 
 Joe Horae – guitar
 Pete O'Malley – guitar
 Martyn Millard – bass guitar
 Chris Turner – drums
 Ben Ward – vocals

Orange Goblin albums
2000 EPs
Split EPs
Alabama Thunderpussy albums